Roundaway is an unincorporated community located in Coahoma County, Mississippi, United States. Roundaway is located on the former Yazoo and Mississippi Valley Railroad. A public school was once operated in Roundaway. A post office operated under the name Roundaway from 1905 to 1935.

References

Unincorporated communities in Coahoma County, Mississippi
Unincorporated communities in Mississippi